Anonymous is a decentralized virtual community. They are commonly referred to as an internet-based collective of hacktivists whose goals, like its organization, are decentralized. Anonymous seeks mass awareness and revolution against what the organization perceives as corrupt entities, while attempting to maintain anonymity. Anonymous has had a hacktivist impact. This is a timeline of activities reported to be carried out by the group.

2006–2007

Hal Turner raid

According to radio Hal Turner, in December 2006 and January 2007 individuals who identified themselves as Anonymous took Turner's website offline, costing him thousands of dollars in bandwidth bills. As a result, Turner sued 4chan, eBaum's World, 7chan, and other websites for copyright infringement. He lost his plea for an injunction; however, failed to receive letters from the court, which caused the lawsuit to lapse.

Chris Forcand arrest
On December 7, 2007, the Canada-based Toronto Sun newspaper published a report on the arrest of the alleged Internet predator Chris Forcand. Forcand, 53, was charged with two counts of luring a child under the age of 14, attempt to invite sexual touching, attempted exposure, possessing a dangerous weapon, and carrying a concealed weapon. The report stated that Forcand was already being tracked by "cyber-vigilantes who seek to out anyone who presents with a sexual interest in children" before police investigations commenced.

The Global Television Network report identified the group responsible for Forcand's arrest as a "self-described Internet vigilante group called Anonymous" who contacted the police after some members were "propositioned" by Forcand with "disgusting photos of himself". The report also stated that this is the first time a suspected Internet predator was arrested by the police as a result of Internet vigilantism.

2008

Project Chanology

The group gained worldwide press for Project Chanology, the protest against the Church of Scientology.

On January 14, 2008, a video produced by the Church featuring an interview with Tom Cruise was leaked to the Internet and uploaded to YouTube. The Church of Scientology issued a copyright violation claim against YouTube requesting the removal of the video. In response to this, Anonymous formulated Project Chanology. Calling the action by the Church of Scientology a form of Internet censorship, members of Project Chanology organized a series of denial-of-service attacks against Scientology websites, prank calls, and black faxes to Scientology centers.

On January 21, 2008, individuals claiming to speak for Anonymous announced their goals and intentions via a video posted to YouTube entitled "Message to Scientology" and a press release declaring a "War on Scientology" against both the Church of Scientology and the Religious Technology Center. In the press release, the group states that the attacks against the Church of Scientology will continue in order to protect the right to freedom of speech and end what they believe to be the financial exploitation of church members. A new video "Call to Action" appeared on YouTube on January 28, 2008, calling for protests outside Church of Scientology centers on February 10, 2008. On February 2, 2008, 150 people gathered outside of a Church of Scientology center in Orlando, Florida to protest the organization's practices. Small protests were also held in Santa Barbara, California, and Manchester, England. On February 10, 2008, about 7000 people protested in more than 93 cities worldwide. Many protesters wore masks, or otherwise disguised their identities, in part to protect themselves from reprisals from the Church.

Anonymous held a second wave of protests on March 15, 2008, in cities all over the world, including Boston, Dallas, Chicago, Los Angeles, London, Paris, Vancouver, Toronto, Berlin, and Dublin. The global turnout was estimated to be "between 7000 and 8000", a number similar to that of the first wave. The third wave of protests took place on April 12, 2008. Named "Operation Reconnect", it aimed to increase awareness of the Church of Scientology's disconnection policy.

On October 17, 2008, an 18-year-old from New Jersey described himself as a member of Anonymous, and he stated that he would plead guilty to involvement in the January 2008 DDoS attacks against Church of Scientology websites.

Protests continued, taking advantage of media events such as the premiere of the Tom Cruise movie Valkyrie, where the venue was chosen in part to reduce exposure to the protests.

Epilepsy Foundation forum invasion

On March 28, 2008, Wired News reported that "Internet griefers"—a slang term for people whose only interests are in harassing others—assaulted an epilepsy support forum run by the Epilepsy Foundation of America. JavaScript code and flashing computer animations were posted with the intention of triggering migraine headaches and seizures in photosensitive and pattern-sensitive epileptics. According to Wired News, circumstantial evidence suggested that the attack was perpetrated by Anonymous users, with the initial attack posts on the epilepsy forum blaming eBaum's World. Members of the epilepsy forum claimed they had found a thread in which the attack was being planned at 4chan.org, an imageboard that has been described as a stronghold for Anonymous. The thread, like all old threads eventually do on these types of imageboards, has since cycled to deletion.

News.com.au reported that the administrators of 4chan.org had posted an open letter claiming that the attacks had been carried out by the Church of Scientology "to ruin the public opinion of Anonymous, to lessen the effect of the lawful protests against their virulent organization" under the Church's fair game policy.

Defacement of SOHH and AllHipHop websites

In late June 2008, users who identified themselves as Anonymous claimed responsibility for a series of attacks against the SOHH (Support Online Hip Hop) website. The attack was reported to have begun in retaliation for insults made by members of SOHH's "Just Bugging Out" forum against members of Anonymous. The attack against the website took place in stages, as Anonymous users flooded the SOHH forums, which were then shut down. On June 23, 2008, the group which identified themselves as Anonymous organized DDoS attacks against the website, successfully eliminating 60% of the website's service capacity. On June 27, 2008, the hackers utilized cross-site scripting to deface the website's main page with satirical Nazi images and headlines referencing numerous racial stereotypes and slurs, and also successfully stole information from SOHH employees. Following the defacement, the website was temporarily shut down by its administration. AllHipHop, an unrelated website, also had its forum raided.

Sarah Palin email hack

Shortly after midnight on September 16, 2008, the private Yahoo! Mail account of Sarah Palin was hacked by a 4chan user. The hacker, known as "Rubico", claimed he had read Palin's personal e-mails because he was looking for something that "would derail her campaign". After reading through Palin's emails, Rubico wrote, "There was nothing there, nothing incriminating — all I saw was personal stuff, some clerical stuff from when she was governor." Rubico wrote that he used the Sarah Palin Wikipedia article to find Palin's birth date (one of the standard security questions used by Yahoo!.) in "15 seconds". The hacker posted the account's password on /b/, an image board on 4chan, and screenshots from within the account to WikiLeaks. A /b/ user then logged in and changed the password, posting a screenshot of his sending an email to a friend of Palin's informing her of the new password on the /b/ thread. However, he did not blank out the password in the screenshot. A multitude of /b/ users then attempted to log in with the new password, and the account was automatically locked out by Yahoo!. The incident was criticized by some /b/ users, one of whom complained that "seriously, /b/. We could have changed history and failed, epically."

2009

No Cussing Club
In January 2009, members of Anonymous targeted South Pasadena, California teen McKay Hatch who runs the No Cussing Club, a website against profanity. As Hatch's home address, phone number, and other personal information were leaked on the internet, his family has received hate mail, obscene phone calls, and bogus pizza and pornography deliveries.

2009 Iranian election protests

Following allegations of vote rigging after the results of the June 2009 Iranian presidential election were announced, declaring Iran's incumbent President Mahmoud Ahmadinejad as the winner, thousands of Iranians participated in demonstrations. Anonymous, together with The Pirate Bay and various Iranian hackers, launched an Iranian Green Movement Support site called Anonymous Iran. The site has drawn over 22,000 supporters worldwide and allows for information exchange between the world and Iran, despite attempts by the Iranian government to censor news about the riots on the internet. The site provides resources and support to Iranians who are protesting.

Operation Didgeridie

In September 2009, the group reawakened "in order to protect civil rights" after several governments began to block access to its imageboards. The blacklisting of Krautchan.net in Germany infuriated many, but the tipping point was the Australian government's plans for ISP-level censorship of the internet. The policy was spearheaded by Stephen Conroy and had been driven aggressively by the Rudd Government since its election in 2007.

Early in the evening of September 9, Anonymous took down the prime minister's website with a distributed denial-of-service attack. The site was taken offline for approximately one hour.

2010

Operation Titstorm

Occurred from 8 am, February 10, 2010, as a protest against the Australian Government over the forthcoming internet filtering legislation and the perceived censorship in pornography of small-breasted women (who are perceived to be under age) and female ejaculation. Hours earlier, Anonymous uploaded a video message to YouTube, addressed to Kevin Rudd, and Seven News, presenting a list of demands and threats of further action if they were not met. The protest consisted of a distributed denial-of-service attack (DDoS) on Australian Government websites. Australian anti-censorship groups complained that the attack only hurt their cause, and Australian government members dismissed the attack and said that they would just restore the service when the attack finished. Analysis of the attacks cited their peak bandwidth at under 17Mbit, a figure considered small when compared with other DDoS attacks.

Oregon Tea Party raid
In July 2010, there was a reaction to the use of one of Anonymous' slogans by the Oregon Tea Party. The Party's Facebook page was flooded with image macro and flames. Within a few hours, the Tea Party posted a message saying "Anonymous: We appreciate your resources and admire your tactics. You have taught us more than you know. As requested, we are no longer using the 'anonymous' quote." Following this raid, the Party's Facebook page was removed, and its Ning page limited to member-only access.

Operations Payback, Avenge Assange, and Bradical

In 2010, several Bollywood companies hired Aiplex Software to launch DDoS attacks on websites that did not respond to software takedown notices. File sharing activists then created Operation Payback in September 2010 in retaliation. The original plan was to attack Aiplex Software directly, but upon finding some hours before the planned DDoS that another individual had taken down the firm's website on their own, Operation Payback moved to launching attacks against the websites of copyright stringent organizations, law firms and other websites. This grew into multiple DDoS attacks against anti-piracy groups and law firms.

In December 2010, the document archive website WikiLeaks came under intense pressure to stop publishing secret United States diplomatic cables. In response, Anonymous announced its support for WikiLeaks, and Operation Payback changed its focus to support WikiLeaks and launched DDoS attacks against Amazon, PayPal, MasterCard, Visa and the Swiss bank PostFinance in retaliation for perceived anti-WikiLeaks behavior. This second front in the December offensive was performed under the codename Operation Avenge Assange. Due to the attacks, both MasterCard and Visa's websites were brought down on December 8. A threat researcher at PandaLabs said Anonymous also launched an attack which brought down the Swedish prosecutor's website when WikiLeaks founder Julian Assange was arrested in London and refused bail in relation to extradition to Sweden.

After suspected leaker Chelsea Manning was transferred to Marine Corps Brig, Quantico in July 2010, allegations of abuse arose around Manning's isolation in a maximum security area, and the suicide-watch she was put under which included constant verbal checks by guards and forced nudity. Military officials denied the treatment was abuse or abnormal. In an event that led to his resignation, State Department spokesman Philip J. Crowley made statements condemning the treatment. In response to Manning's imprisonment and treatment, Anonymous threatened to disrupt activities at Quantico by cyber-attacking communications, exposing private information about personnel, and other harassment methods. Dubbed "Operation Bradical", spokesperson and journalist Barrett Brown stated that this would be in direct response for the alleged mistreatment. Military spokespersons responded that the threat has been referred to law enforcement and counterterrorism officials and requested an investigation.

Operation Leakspin
Operation: Leakspin had the purpose of sorting through the WikiLeaks releases to identify potentially overlooked cables. According to the project, exposure had a bigger potential impact than DDoS attacks. Operation: Leakspin included translation and explanation of cables, quality control, culture jamming and publication channels. Leakspin represented a sharp departure from the tactics of Operation Payback. Rather than attacking perceived enemies of the pro-WikiLeaks movement, the sole focus is on propagating material determined to be of public interest. This potentially could lead to media outlets and the general public focusing on the issues uncovered by the released diplomatic cables rather than the morality or sensibility of DDoS attacks as a form of protest or Julian Assange's current legal travails. It is difficult to ascertain how much support Operation Leakspin had garnered in the Anonymous community.

Zimbabwe
The websites of the government of Zimbabwe were targeted by Anonymous due to censorship of the WikiLeaks documents.

2011

Attack on Fine Gael website
The website for the Irish political party, a centre right party in coalition government with the Labour Party, was hacked by Anonymous during the 2011 general election campaign according to TheJournal.ie. The site was replaced with a page showing the Anonymous logo along with the words "Nothing is safe, you put your faith in this political party and they take no measures to protect you. They offer you free speech yet they censor your voice. WAKE UP!".

Arab Spring activities

The websites of the government of Tunisia were targeted by Anonymous due to censorship of the WikiLeaks documents and the Tunisian Revolution. Tunisians were reported to be assisting in these denial-of-service attacks launched by Anonymous. Anonymous's role in the DDoS attacks on the Tunisian government's websites led to an upsurge of internet activism among Tunisians against the government. A figure associated with Anonymous released an online message denouncing the government clampdown on recent protests and posted it on the Tunisian government website. Anonymous named their attacks as "Operation Tunisia". Anonymous successfully performed DDoS attacks on eight Tunisian government websites. The Tunisian government responded by making its websites inaccessible from outside Tunisia. Tunisian police also arrested online activists and bloggers within the country and questioned them on the attacks. Anonymous's website suffered a DDoS attack on January 5.

During the 2011 Egyptian revolution, Egyptian government websites, along with the website of the ruling National Democratic Party, were hacked into and taken offline by Anonymous. The sites remained offline until President Hosni Mubarak stepped down.

Anonymous also released the names and passwords of the email addresses of Middle Eastern governmental officials, in support of the Arab Spring.

Attack on HBGary Federal

On the weekend of February 5–6, 2011, Aaron Barr, the chief executive of the security firm HBGary Federal, announced that his firm had successfully infiltrated the Anonymous group, and although he would not hand over details to the police, he would reveal his findings at a later conference in San Francisco. In retaliation for Aaron Barr's claims, members of the group Anonymous hacked the website of HBGary Federal and replaced the welcome page with a message stating that Anonymous should not be messed with, and that the hacking of the website was necessary to defend itself. Using a variety of techniques, including social engineering and SQL injection, Anonymous also went on to take control of the company's e-mail, dumping 68,000 e-mails from the system, erasing files, and taking down their phone system. The leaked emails revealed the reports and company presentations of other companies in computer security such as Endgame systems who promise high quality offensive software, advertising "subscriptions of $2,500,000 per year for access to 0day exploits".

Among the documents exposed was a PowerPoint presentation entitled "The Wikileaks Threat", put together by HBGary Federal along with two other data intelligence firms for Bank of America in December. Within the report, these firms created a list of important contributors to WikiLeaks; they further developed a strategic plan of attack against the site. As TechHerald explains, "the plan included pressing a journalist in order to disrupt his support of the organization, cyber attacks, disinformation, and other potential proactive tactics." The report specifically claims that Glenn Greenwald's support was key to WikiLeaks' ongoing survival.

Anonymous also personally attacked Aaron Barr by taking control of his Twitter account, posting Mr Barr's supposed home address and social security number.

In response to the attacks, founder of HBGary Federal, Greg Hoglund, responded to journalist Brian Krebs, "They didn't just pick on any company, we try to protect the US Government from hackers. They couldn't have chosen a worse company to pick on." After the attacks, Anonymous continued to clog up HBGary Federal fax machines, and made threatening phone calls.

Operation Ouroboros
On February 16, 2011, the group supposedly wrote an open letter to the Westboro Baptist Church, stating: "Cease & desist your protest campaign in the year 2011... close your public Web sites. Should you ignore this warning... the propaganda & detestable doctrine that you promote will be eradicated; the damage incurred will be irreversible, and neither your institution nor your congregation will ever be able to fully recover." On February 19, 2011, the church responded, telling Anonymous to "bring it on" and calling them, among other things, "a puddle of pimple-faced nerds". Anonymous subsequently denied the authenticity of the threat, suggesting that someone from outside Anonymous had made the posting. Due to their website being openly editable by anyone, it is unknown who made the post. Anonymous responded with a press release calling the Westboro Church "professional trolls" stating that they believe that it was a member of the Westboro Church making an attempt to provoke an attack, thus acting as a honeypot which would both allow the church to retaliate against Internet service providers in court, and to gain it further publicity. They also claimed that they had more pressing matters to attend to, namely the support of the protests that led to the 2011 Libyan civil war. That said, Anonymous later suggested tactics for those who wished to attack Westboro nevertheless, avoiding DDoS in favor of sending "prostitutes, preferably male", and in general to "rape their asses in the most unpredictable ways possible".

Anonymous also indicated that an attack would be self-defeating, stating: "When Anonymous says we support free speech, we mean it. We count Beatrice Hall among our Anonymous forebears: 'I disapprove of what you say, but I will defend to the death your right to say it.'" Nonetheless, Westboro's website at godhatesfags.com suffered an attack. Another hacktivist by the name of Jester claimed to bring down the websites from the Westboro Baptist Church on his Twitter account.

2011 Wisconsin protests

On February 27, 2011, Anonymous announced a new attack on Koch Industries as a response to the Wisconsin protests. Between 1997 and 2008, David and Charles Koch collectively gave more than $17 million to groups, such as Americans for Prosperity, Club for Growth and Citizens United, lobbying against unions. The Kochs are one of (Republican) Governor Walker's largest corporate supporters. Anonymous accused the brothers of attempting "to usurp American Democracy" and called for a boycott of all Koch Industries products.

2011–2012 Operation Empire State Rebellion
On March 14, 2011, Anonymous began releasing emails it said were obtained from Bank of America. According to the group, the files show evidence of "corruption and fraud", and relate to the issue of improper foreclosures. They say that a former employee named Brian Penny from Balboa Insurance, a firm which used to be owned by BofA, appeared to be a reputable insider in the force placed insurance market, a market which, in 2012, began getting more and more coverage from various government and media sources, including the New York Department of Finance, 50 State Attorney General Coalition, the Consumer Financial Protection Bureau, and large class action lawsuits. Balboa Insurance is now owned by Australian Reinsurance company QBE, while Brian privately consults various agencies and institutions on the inside workings of mortgage/insurance tracking systems and force placed insurance while maintaining a blog about his experience as a whistleblower.

Operation Sony

Anonymous announced their intent to attack Sony websites in response to Sony's lawsuit against George Hotz and, specifically due to Sony's gaining access to the IP addresses of all the people who visited George Hotz's blog as part of the libel action, terming it an 'offensive against free speech and internet freedom' Although Anonymous admitted responsibility to subsequent attacks on the Sony websites, Anonymous branch AnonOps denied that they were the cause behind a major outage of the PlayStation Network in April 2011. However, as Anonymous is a leaderless organization, the possibility remains that another branch of the group is responsible for the outage, though screenshots of AnonOps promotion of the attack still exist.

Spanish Police
On June 12, 2011, there was a DDoS attack on the website of the Spanish Police, starting at 21:30 GMT. Anonymous claimed responsibility the following day, stating that the attack was a "direct response to the Friday arrests of three individuals alleged to be associated with acts of cyber civil disobedience attributed to Anonymous." The site was down for approximately an hour as a result of their efforts.

Operation India
The group has come out in support of a civil movement against corruption in India. This cyber movement has been named as 'Operation India'.

Operation Malaysia
On June 15, 2011, the group launched attacks on ninety-one websites of the Malaysian government in response to the blocking of websites like WikiLeaks and The Pirate Bay within the country, which the group labels censorship of a basic human right to information.

Operation Orlando
On June 20, 2011, members of the group took down the websites of the Orlando, Florida Chamber of Commerce and inserted a message into the website of the Universal Orlando Resort requesting that users "boycott Orlando". The group did so in response to the arrests of members of Food Not Bombs for feeding the homeless in Lake Eola Park against city ordinances. The group had planned and announced the attack on their IRC channel. The group has vowed to take a different Orlando-related website offline every day, and have also targeted the re-election website of Mayor of Orlando Buddy Dyer and the Orlando International Airport. A member of the group left a Guy Fawkes mask outside of the mayor's home; the police are treating the picture taken of the mask as a threat against the mayor. On July 11, the group took down the website of the Roman Catholic Diocese of Orlando and the Rotary Club of Orlando.

Operation Intifada
On June 28, 2011, Anonymous announced that within the next 24 hours, it would hack into the website of the Knesset, the legislature of Israel, and knock it offline. It was stated that the planned attacks were a response to alleged hacking attacks by Israeli intelligence such as the Stuxnet virus, a computer virus which allegedly was created by Israeli and U.S. intelligence and targeted the Iranian nuclear program.

Operation Anti-Security

The group collaborated with LulzSec to hack the websites of a number of government and corporate sources and release information from them. As well as targeting American sites, Anonymous also targeted government sites in Tunisia, Anguilla, Brazil, Zimbabwe, Turkey, and Australia. On July 21, Anonymous released two PDFs allegedly taken from NATO.

Operation Facebook
In August 2011, someone created an account on Twitter with the name OP_Facebook and announced the "Operation Facebook". According to the links on the post, Anonymous was going to take down Facebook on November 5, 2011. The date "November 5" is believed to be a reference to V for Vendetta, where the character "V" conducts his plans every fifth of November in memory of Guy Fawkes. This operation isn't assuredly an Anonymous one. There was an earlier OpFacebook that was abandoned, and this was an attempted revival. The plan was contentious and does not appear to be supported by the majority of those who say they are part of Anonymous.

Operation BART

In August 2011, in response to Bay Area Rapid Transit's shutdown of cell phone service in an attempt to disconnect protesters from assembling in response to a police shooting, as well as the shooting itself, Anonymous sent out a mass email/fax bomb to BART personnel and organized multiple mass physical protests at the network's Civic Center station. Anonymous also hacked the BART website, releasing the personal information of 102 BART police officers, as well as account information for about 2,000 customers.

Shooting Sheriffs Saturday
In an event dubbed "Shooting Sheriffs Saturday," Anonymous hacked 70 (mostly rural) law enforcement websites and released 10 GB of leaked emails, training files, informant information and other information. The name is likely a reference to the song "I Shot the Sheriff" by Bob Marley.

Support of Occupy Wall Street
Several contingents of Anonymous have given support to the Occupy Wall Street movement, with members attending local protests and blogs run by members covering the movement.

Operation Syria
In early August, Anonymous hacked the Syrian Defense Ministry website and replaced it with a vector image of the pre-Ba'athist flag, a symbol of the pro-democracy movement in the country, as well as a message supporting the 2011 Syrian uprising and calling on members of the Syrian Army to defect to protect protesters.

Operation DarkNet

In October 2011, the collective campaigned against child pornography protected by anonymous hosting techniques. They temporarily DDoSed 40 child porn sites, published the usernames of over 1500 people frequenting one of those websites, and invited the U.S. Federal Bureau of Investigation and Interpol to follow up.

Opposition to Los Zetas
On October 6, 2011, Anonymous released a video stating that Los Zetas had kidnapped one of the group's members, and threatened that unless the hostage was freed, they would publish personal information about members of the cartel and their collaborators in politics, police, military, and business, which might lead to their prosecution by Mexican authorities, or targeting by rival cartels. The website of Gustavo Rosario Torres, a former Tabasco state prosecutor, was subsequently defaced with a message suggesting his involvement with the organization. According to Anonymous Iberoamerica blog, in early November Los Zetas reportedly freed the kidnapped victim without knowledge of its Anonymous affiliation. However, following widespread news coverage of the video, reporters did not find evidence of a previous Anonymous action matching the description given, and found little evidence of support among Anonymous members, particularly in Mexico.

Operation Brotherhood Takedown
On November 7, 2011, Anonymous released a warning threat to the Muslim Brotherhood that they would take down major websites belonging to their organization. On November 12 the Muslim Brotherhood released a statement detailing the extent of the attack and that four websites were temporarily taken down. On November 12, 2011, another video was released claiming the attack would continue until November 18.

John Pike incident
In response to the UC Davis pepper-spray incident, Anonymous released the personal information of John Pike, the officer that pepper-sprayed peaceful protestors.

Attack on Stratfor

On December 24, claims were made that Anonymous stole thousands of e-mail addresses and credit card information from security firm Stratfor. Reportedly, Anonymous commented that this is because the data was unencrypted, however some members of Anonymous denied the group was involved. The hackers included Jeremy Hammond, who worked with Anonymous to release Stratfor's 5,543,061 emails to WikiLeaks. The emails revealed Stratfor's surveillance of groups such as Occupy Wall Street and protestors of the Bhopal disaster.

Operation Pharisee
Operation Pharisee was an attack organized via social media such as Facebook, Twitter, and YouTube against the Vatican website for World Youth Day 2011. It was unsuccessful, despite a denial-of-service attack resulting 34 times normal traffic, and well-documented due to the efforts of Imperva, the security firm employed by the Vatican.

Operation Deepthroat
Anonymous, along with 4chan's /b/ board, Reddit, Twitter and Funnyjunk, teamed together to make a raid on 9gag called Operation Deepthroat. The raid was separated in multiple teams: The first team, the Alpha Team, spammed "horrifying" images of child pornography, gore, furries and scat on 9gag's site, followed by fake accounts made by 4chan, Anonymous, Reddit, Twitter and Funnyjunk voting the spam up, effectively overloading the servers. The second team, the Gold Team, used the Low Orbit Ion Cannon and the High Orbit Ion Cannon (LOIC and HOIC, respectively), and fired on 9gag, which DDoS'd the entire site down. The third team, the Red Team, was tasked to spread the information of the OP on 4chan, Reddit, Twitter and Funnyjunk, and also supported the other teams. The fourth and final team, the White Team, was tasked with spamming chat sites such as Omegle and Chatroulette with inappropriate messages, such as "9gag.com is the place for Child Pornography!", in order to tarnish 9gag's "wholesome" and "family-friendly" name. The reason behind this whole operation began when 9gag took several of 4chan's memes and called them theirs, followed by making a legion called the '9gag army', a ripoff of Anonymous. The operation began on December 21, 2011, at 12:00 AM, and ended at 11:59 PM. 9gag was mainly offline for the next few days, except for some servers which managed to protect themselves from the LOIC and HOIC. Prior to the operation, 4chan users used fake accounts to trick 9gaggers into DDoS'ing themselves, saying the coordinates were that of 4chan. The pre-raid attack was mostly ineffective, however, as only a few servers went down.

2012

CSLEA hack 
In January 2012, Anonymous hacked the website of the California Statewide Law Enforcement Association to protest police brutality.

Occupy Nigeria
In solidarity with Occupy Nigeria, Anonymous has joined forces with the People's Liberation Front and the Naija Cyber Hactivists of Nigeria. Anonymous promised "a relentless and devastating assault upon the web assets of the Nigerian government" in support of Occupy Nigeria.
This was in protest to the removal of fuel subsidy that the majority of impoverished Nigerians depend upon for their very existence, causing the price of fuel and transportation to skyrocket and therefore extreme hardship for the majority of Nigerians. On January 13, the Nigerian Economic and Financial Crimes Commission website was hacked, with a false report of the arrest of people involved in the oil sector replacing the normal page.

Operation Megaupload

In retaliation for the shut down of the file sharing service Megaupload and the arrest of four workers, Anonymous DDoSed the websites of UMG (the company responsible for the lawsuit against Megaupload), the United States Department of Justice, the United States Copyright Office, the Federal Bureau of Investigation, the MPAA, Warner Brothers Music, the RIAA, and the HADOPI the afternoon of January 19, 2012. The operations by Anonymous were speculated to have been driven further by anger over the House of Representatives' Stop Online Piracy Act (SOPA) and the Senate's Protect Intellectual Property Act (PIPA).

Anti-ACTA activism in Europe
On January 21, 2012, a series of DDoS attacks on Polish government websites took place, for which the Anonymous took responsibility and referred to as "the Polish Revolution". The group via their Twitter account stated it was a revenge for upcoming signing of ACTA agreement by the Polish government. Starting with websites of the Sejm, Polish Prime Minister, President, Ministry of Culture and National Heritage, later on websites of the police, Internal Security Agency, Ministry of Foreign Affairs were also blocked. The presumed attack was further strengthened by the media coverage which resulted in extremely high interest of public opinion, followed up by blackout of popular Polish websites on 24th and protests of thousands of people on January 24 and 25, in major cities of Poland, against signing ACTA. Other suspected targets were the websites of Paweł Graś - the government's spokesman (blocked after Graś denied the attacks ever took place), the website of PSL (blocked after Eugeniusz Kłopotek, a member of the party, supported ACTA on air of the major TV station). Governmental sites in France's presidential website and Austria's Ministry of Justice, Ministry of Internal Affairs, Ministry of Economy and also the website of the Federal Chancellor were also cracked and paralyzed.

Anonymous in Slovenia announced opposition against the Slovenian signing of the ACTA and have posted video threats on various websites against the government officials, as well as against Nova Ljubljanska Banka (commonly known as NLB), accusing the latter of corruption. On February 4, 2012, The NLB was a victim of a cyber attack and was offline for one hour, while public demonstrations were held in the capital of Ljubljana and in Maribor. Some estimated 3000 people gathered in the capital, while around 300 protested in Maribor.

Operation Russia
Unidentified hackers cracked email boxes of some prominent pro-Kremlin activists and officials, including Vasily Yakemenko, head of the Federal Agency for Youth Affairs, Kristina Potupchik, press secretary for Nashi youth movement, and Oleg Khorokhordin, deputy head of the Department for Internal Affairs at the Presidential Administration. Since February 1, links to contents of the mailboxes have been appearing on @OP_Russia Twitter account. The hackers confirmed they consider themselves a part of the Anonymous movement; "We are Anonymous", they stated in an interview. The information discovered enabled many to accuse Yakemenko and his colleagues in paying some influential bloggers, as well as numerous trolls, for publishing stories and commenting in favour of Vladimir Putin on negative press articles on the Internet.

Boston Police Department attacks 

On February 3, 2012, Anonymous hacked a website belonging to the Boston Police Department to protest the eviction of Occupy Wall Street protestors. BPD later responded with a sarcastic video of their own.

Preventing vote tampering 
In 2012, Anonymous claims to have added a firewall they called The Great Oz, allegedly designed to prevent election tampering in the United States.

Syrian Government E-mail Hack

On February 6, 2012, Anonymous broke into the mail server of the Syrian Ministry of Presidential Affairs, gaining access to some 78 inboxes of Bashar al-Assad's staffers in the process. One of the email files was a document preparing Assad for his December 2011 interview with ABC's Barbara Walters. One of the passwords commonly used by Assad's office accounts was "12345."

In July 2012, Anonymous gave over 2.4 million e-mails to WikiLeaks.

AntiSec Leak and CIA Attack
On Friday, February 10, 2012, Anonymous claimed responsibility for taking down the Central Intelligence Agency's website for more than 5 hours. Several servers went back up while others stayed down. This followed a conversation leak, in which Anonymous took responsibility, between FBI and Scotland Yard officials discussing members of Anonymous being put on trial as well as other topics on the group, which took place a week before. On March 6, 2012, Donncha O'Cearbhaill was charged in connection with the leak. He was released 24-hours later.

Interpol Attack
Following Interpol's announcement on February 28 that they made arrests of 25 suspected members of the hacking activist group Anonymous in Europe and South America, their site went down for a moment.

AIPAC Attack
On March 4, 2012, Anonymous took down the American Israel Public Affairs Committee website. An AIPAC spokesman was questioned on the matter but did not respond. A video titled "Anonymous: Message to AIPAC" was uploaded on YouTube earlier the same day.

Vatican website DDoS Attacks
The official website of the Vatican was brought down temporarily by a DDoS attack from Anonymous on March 7, 2012. Later that day the website recovered. Anonymous has also attempted to take the site down in 2011 but the attempt did not succeed. They claimed that their attack was not targeted against the followers of the Catholic Church but against the Church itself, which Anonymous viewed as corrupt.

On March 12 the Vatican's official website was brought down for a few hours by a second DDoS attack. Anonymous also hacked Vatican Radio and gained access to the Vatican Radio database in protest against the Vatican Radio allegedly using "repeaters with power transmission largely outside the bounds of the law."

Bureau of Justice leak
On March 21, 2012, 1.7GB of data was stolen from the United States Bureau of Justice Statistics by Anonymous. The leak reportedly contained "shiny things such as internal emails and the entire database dump."

Taking down Monsanto's Hungarian website
On March 16 the official website of Monsanto's Hungarian website collapsed and wasn't restored until March 26.

Symantec source code leak
In March 2012, people claiming to be a part of Anonymous leaked the source code for old versions of Norton AntiVirus and Norton Utilities.

April 2012 Chinese attack
In April 2012, Anonymous hacked 485 Chinese government websites, some more than once, to protest the treatment of their citizens. They urged people to "fight for justice, fight for freedom, [and] fight for democracy".

Operation Bahrain and Formula One attacks
On April 21, Anonymous defaced the official site of Formula One, in protest against the 2012 Bahrain Grand Prix. The race was the subject of ongoing controversy, as it was being held during ongoing anti-government protests, with the support of the government. Anonymous posted a press release criticising the decision to hold the race despite the violent crackdowns, and posted data of ticket sales for the event with sensitive information — particularly the credit card numbers of spectators — redacted. Other sites related to the sport and the Bahraini government were also the subject of distributed denial-of-service attack.

Occupy Philippines
On April 21, 2012 busabos of Anonymous Philippines attacked the China University Media Union website, as a retaliation against alleged Chinese hackers who defaced the University of the Philippines website, which claimed that the Scarborough Shoal is Chinese territory. Anonymous left a message that the Scarborough Shoal is the Philippines' territory. On April 25, 2012, busabos of Anonymous #OccupyPhilippines warned that they had not yet started their attack against Chinese websites. The members that can be counted in hand called the cyber attacks were a result of the 2012 Scarborough Shoal standoff.

Operation India
On May 17, 2012, Anonymous launched an attack against the websites of the India Supreme Court and the current-ruling Congress party in reaction to internet service providers blocking popular video sites like Vimeo as well as file-sharing sites like The Pirate Bay.

Operation Quebec

On May 20, 2012, Anonymous launched Opération Québec in reaction to the adoption of Bill 78 by the government of Quebec, an act restricting the freedom of association in this Canadian province after several weeks of student protests. A video was released urging the governing Liberal Party of Quebec to let the citizens protest.

On May 21, the websites of the Liberal Party of Quebec, of the Ministry of Public Security of Quebec as well as a government site on police ethics were DDoSed.

Anonymous then threatened to disrupt the Formula 1 Grand Prix of Canada, to be held between June 7 and 10 in Montreal, the same way they did for the Bahrain Grand Prix. They claimed to have accessed personal information stored in the F1 website.

On May 30, Anonymous leaked a video called "DVD Gouverne (mental)", a 2 hours long footage from Sagard, Quebec where a party for the wife of Paul Desmarais of Power Corporation had been held in 2008. Among the guests were former US president George H. Bush, premier Jean Charest of Quebec, former Canadian prime ministers Jean Chrétien and Brian Mulroney, former Québec premier Lucien Bouchard, former governor general of Canada Adrienne Clarkson, journalist Charlie Rose, singers Robert Charlebois and Hiromi Omura, lyricist Luc Plamondon and conductor Yannick Nézet-Séguin.

Operation Cyprus
An Anonymous video was released on June 8, 2012, claiming that an attack against the government of Cyprus would take place due to reasons of government corruption, media misinformation and the Anti-Counterfeiting Trade Agreement On June 26, DDoS attacks took place against 47 websites of the Republic of Cyprus, which were taken down for 15 hours. The government stated that it was a coordinated attack by Anonymous.

Operation Japan
On June 26, 2012, the website of the Japanese Business Federation, was taken offline, with Anonymous claiming this was part of "Operation Japan". The reason for their action was the new amendments to the copyright laws in Japan. For those found to have illegally copied material such as music, DVDs or Blu-ray discs, fines could run as high as $25,000 and carry a sentence of two years in prison, according to CNET Japan.

Operation Anaheim 
On July 25, 2012, Anonymous launched an online protest in response to the Anaheim police shooting. It began with the release of the personal information of some of the top officers, including police chief John Welter.

AAPT attack 
In July 2012, Anonymous hacked Australian ISP AAPT and later leaked 40 GB of partially redacted customer data to protest data retention policy.

Attack on the Mexican PRI party 
On July 6, 2012, as part of the Yo Soy 132 student protest movement, the Mexican branch of Anonymous defaced the PRI party website, the party that held the power of the country for 70 years and that the 132 movement accused of human rights violations during that period. Anonymous hacked the site leaving slogans against the electoral fraud and the imminent return of the PRI party to power.

Peña's birthday present 
On July 20, 2012, a second attack on a PRI related website was performed as part of the Yo Soy 132 student protest movement, by the Mexican branch of Anonymous. This time Anonymous did it on the birthday of president elect Peña Nieto, and as "a gift" they left a picture of Peña next to slogans against electoral fraud and a penis shaped birthday cake.

Operation Myanmar 

On August 10, 2012, Anonymous launched a DDoS attack and defacement of more than 100 Myanmar websites, all hackers from all over the world joined this operation as a protest for killing Muslim Rohingya in Myanmar. Myanmar's hackers also made a lot of counterattacks.

Uganda LGBT rights 
On August 13, 2012, Anonymous hacked two Uganda government websites to protest the country's strict anti-gay laws.

Hong Kong National Education 
In mid-September 2012, Anonymous hackers threatened the Hong Kong government organization, known as National Education Centre. In their online video, Anonymous members claimed responsibility for leaking classified related government documents and taking down the National Education Centre website, after the Hong Kong government has repeatedly ignored months of wide-scale protests against the establishment of a new core Moral and National Education curriculum for children from 6–18 years of age. The new syllabus has come under heavy criticism and international media attention, as it does not award students based on how much factual information is learned, but instead grades and evaluates students based on their level of emotional attachment and approval of the Chinese Communist Party.

Philippine Cybercrime Prevention Act of 2012 
Anonymous Philippines launched a series of attacks against several websites of the Philippine government to protest against the Cybercrime Prevention Act of 2012. The hackers urged for the revisions of the cybercrime law. On September 26, Anonymous defaced several websites, including that of the Bangko Sentral ng Pilipinas and the Philippine National Police. They claim that the law violates freedom of expression and described the law as "most notorious act ever witnessed in the cyber-history". On October 1, they hacked again several government websites in an operation dubbed as "Bloody Monday" and asked for "a revision of the [Cybercrime Law] for the betterment of the Filipino netizens." In February 2014 the Philippine Supreme Court ruled out the online libel to be unconstitutional because of its some provisions.

Release of Westboro Baptist Church Personal Information 
Anonymous re-posted the names, addresses, and emails of the prominent members of the Westboro Baptist Church on December 16, 2012, due to announced plans to picket the funerals of the victims of the Sandy Hook Elementary School shooting, followed by saying that God would protect their site. They also caused several DDOS attacks on the site itself, hacked the social media accounts of the members involved, and started a whitehouse.org petition to get the Church legally branded as a Hate Group.

2013

Steubenville rape case 

In early 2013, the group released an incriminating video, photographs and tweets from the Steubenville High School football team allegedly involved in a gang rape of an underage girl in rural Ohio. They also released a number of e-mails and photos hacked from the e-mail account of one of the football programs boosters, whom they alleged to have helped cover up the case.

Attack on the Mexican Army website 

On January 13, 2013, the SEDENA (the Mexican Army) website was penetrated by the Anonymous branch in Mexico, and all the information found on the vulnerable servers was disclosed (including usernames and passwords).

The content of the site was changed for a video with images of the riots that occurred during Peña Nieto's presidential inauguration (on December 1, 2013), and a voice in the background pronounces the Zapatista manifesto.

The reason behind this attack was a retaliation against what they call the return of an oppressive government imposed by electoral fraud.

Aaron Swartz Suicide 
In January 2013, the group attacked and defaced the United States Sentencing Commission website turning it into a game page repeatedly after which traffic to the website made it crash following the suicide of Reddit co-founder and activist Aaron Swartz. Swartz was accused of stealing materials from the Massachusetts Institute of Technology with intent to distribute them freely.

Federal Reserve 
The Federal Reserve was hacked by Anonymous in February 2013.

Operation North Korea 

On April 2, 2013, a professional IT webzine BGR carried out an article stating that hacker group Anonymous has started the 'Operation Free Korea.' This calls for 'controversial leader Kim Jong-un [to] resign', 'install free democracy' 'abandon its nuclear ambitions' 'uncensored Internet access' etc. The hackers also proclaimed that if North Korea do not accede to their demand, they will wage "Cyber War." On April 3, 2013, hacker group identifying itself as Anonymous claimed it had stolen all 15,000 user passwords as part of a cyberwar against the DPRK. A few days later, Anonymous claimed to have hacked into the Uriminzokkiri main website, and the Twitter and Flickr pages representing the website.

Instead, a picture posted Thursday on the North's Flickr site shows Kim's face with a pig-like snout and a drawing of Mickey Mouse on his chest. Underneath, the text reads: "Threatening world peace with ICBMs and Nuclear weapons/Wasting money while his people starve to death." It found common ground with its alleged arch-enemy and hacktivist The Jester in which the latter had claimed responsibility for the cyberattacks against Air Koryo and other North Korean websites.

On June 22, 2013, Anonymous claimed that it managed to steal military documents from North Korea, and that the documents would be released on June 25, the day the Korean War started. However, no such documents appear to have been released.

Op Israel
OpIsrael was a coordinated cyber-attack by anti-Israel individuals and Anonymous-affiliated groups that target websites perceived as Israeli The attack, mostly denial of service assaults, was coordinated to coincide with Holocaust Remembrance Day. OpIsrael's stated goal was to "erase Israel from the internet". The attack targeted several government online operations banking and commerce sites, but most of the cyber attacks were repelled, with no significant damage done, although an attack may have succeeded in temporarily taking down the Central Bureau of Statistics site. Media and small business sites were also targeted, and some attacks succeeded in temporarily replacing some of homepages with anti-Israel slogans. However, there were several Facebook pages, Twitter feeds, and web sites from the alleged hackers making false claims to have "caused Israel to lose $5 billion" and "Tel Aviv loses all Internet connection. It was one of Anonymous's biggest failures"

Nir Goldshlager a famous "white hat" hacker and CEO of Break Security Goldshlager, told reporters that OpIsrael hackers "lacked the sophistication and knowledge...while they told many lies to enhance their reputations." Israeli hackers responded to OpIsrael by taking down the OpIsrael website and replacing it with pro-Israel statements and the Israeli national anthem, Hatikvah. In addition, they brought down anti-Israeli sites like Hezbollah's and Islamic Jihad's websites and targeted servers belonging to hackers and broke into the personal computers of the European leaders of the operation and told them to look for the facts and not believe everything they see on the Internet.

2012 Cleveland police shooting incident 
In December 2012, Cleveland police fired 137 rounds at a car, killing its two occupants. Anonymous responded in April 2013 by releasing the personal information of the officers involved. 12 officers were later fired or disciplined for their role in the shooting, although criminal charges are still being considered by a grand jury.

Rehtaeh Parsons 
In response to the suicide of Rehtaeh Parsons and the lack of action on the part of Canadian authorities, Anonymous threatened to release the personal information of the rapists. However, the group claimed to back down from the threat following pleas from Parsons' mother, Leah. The group has staged protests outside the Royal Canadian Mounted Police headquarters in Halifax.

Sabah Crisis 
In March 2013 during the Lahad Datu standoff tension in Sabah due to the clashes between the Royal Army of the Sultanate of Sulu and Malaysian security Forces. A Cyberwar sparks between Philippines and Malaysia. According to the Philippine Cyber Army the Malaysian hackers appeared to have started the attacks and defacement on Philippine websites, posting online threats and videos meaning to send a message to the Filipinos to keep away from the region of Sabah. In response to their attacks the Philippine Cyber Army defaced 175 Malaysian sites (including state-owned pages). The Mcafee Lab Researchers in their 2013 Threats Report placed the Philippine Cyber Army in the list of Global Threats on hacktivism. The Philippine Cyber Army are close to Anonymous.

Philippine Coast Guard incident 
On May 9, 2013, a number of Philippine Coast Guard soldiers fired at an unarmed Taiwanese fishing boat, Guang Da Xing No. 28, and killed a Taiwanese fisherman in international waters. On May 10, Hackers recognizing themselves as "AnonTAIWAN" hacked into Philippine Official websites asking for the Philippines' government to apologize to Taiwan's government. They interfered with government official websites of the Philippines, causing inconveniences for the Philippine General Election. Its resulted in great difficulty and delay in making general access through the Philippine government websites at the time of elections.

EDL 
In May 2013, Anonymous published the personal information of various English Defence League members online in what Anonymous said was the first part of an attempt to destroy the far right protest movement.

Public NSA documents 
On June 7, 2013, Anonymous released what was claimed to be secret documents related to the NSA. In reality, the documents were already publicly available.

Hawthorne dog shooting incident 

On June 30, 2013, a Hawthorne, California police officer, Jeffrey Salmon of Torrance, was filmed shooting a dog and arresting his owner. Anonymous responded by issuing a video threat to the police department. The city website also suffered a DDoS attack, although it is unclear if Anonymous was involved.

Nigeria anti-gay laws 
On July 4, 2013, Anonymous hacked the national website of Nigeria after the country passed laws that would make homosexuality punishable by up to 14 years in prison.

The GCSB 
Anonymous NZ, a New Zealand-based offshoot of Anonymous, carried out its first operation by staging a DDoS on the web site of the Government Communications Security Bureau (GCSB), following the passage of law changes that allowed the electronic intelligence agency to surveil New Zealand citizens. In addition, the web sites of politicians who supported the law changes were also shut down by Anonymous NZ.

Operation Singapore

From August 20, 2013, to November 5, 2013, the group launched attacks on various websites including Ang Mo Kio Town Council, National Museum of Singapore which they leaked 3,600 emails, IP addresses and names from, PAP Community Foundation, and The Straits Times.

National Party-linked websites attacks 
Anonymous New Zealand claimed attacks on National Party-linked websites in protest against the GCSB Bill have had no thanks from spied-on internet mogul Kim Dotcom.

Support of anti-PDAF movement
Anonymous Philippines has hacked 115 government websites, prompting Philippine law enforcement agencies to go after them, citing the unnecessary use of hacking. The NBI has been ordered to probe into the hacking of government websites. While a few Senators have downplayed the attacks, they were willing to listen to their grievances, Senator Trillanes IV expressed alarm with the group's capabilities, suggesting the possibility of the group to hack government websites since "it could compromise State operations and data storage."

2014

Operation Ferguson
Anonymous posted a video warning to the Ferguson, Missouri, police, admonishing them for fatally shooting Mike Brown, an unarmed African American teenager, and swearing revenge if any protesters demonstrating against the police are harmed. The group, which has adopted the Guy Fawkes mask as its symbol and frequently becomes involved in contentious legal matters, said in the video late Sunday Brown's death Saturday is just the latest example of police misconduct having deadly big consequences.

On August 12, a series of doxes were released against Jon Belmar, the St. Louis County Police Chief. There were two reasons for this target. 1) Because he refused to release the name of the officer who shot Mike Brown and 2) Because he challenged Anonymous, calling their threats hollow. A Twitter account affiliated with Anonymous struck back with information regarding Belmar's location, phone number, family members, and their accounts on social media. That same account also released information claiming to be the dox of the officer who shot Brown, but wound up being incorrect.

Operation Hong Kong

Anonymous posted a video warning on News2Share to the Government of the Hong Kong Special Administrative Region on October 1 announcing the engagement of Operation Hong Kong, condemning the government's police's use of force in the ongoing protests. The group stated that it supports the protesters' fight for democracy and promised the government that if the protesters are further harmed or harassed they would attack all web based assets of the Hong Kong Government including but not limited to the taking down of government websites, seizing of government databases, and releasing the personal information on government officials. Anonymous stated that it is time for democracy for the people of Hong Kong and condemns the police for harming the citizens and calls for them to instead protect the citizens.

On October 2, there have been reports that Anonymous have already taken over a few company websites in Hong Kong in accordance to a Hong Kong newspaper Apple Daily.

The Hong Kong Government responded that its servers and web assets are functioning normally, and have arranged to strengthen its cyber defences. The Government further stated that it is prepared against any attempts by Anonymous hackers on its servers and web assets.

Operation Infosurge
November 8, Anonymous Leyte began hacking Philippine government websites to protest the alleged incompetence government officials exhibited in the aftermath of Super Typhoon Yolanda (Haiyan).

More than 10 government websites were defaced by the said group and 33 more were brought rendered inaccessible, for up to 7 hours and a week before, the Department of Trade and Industry (DTI) was reportedly hacked with some 2,000 email addresses, usernames, and password hashes released on Pastebin.

The "Operation Infosurge" was done during the Haiyan Anniversary, which was expected to be a day of prayer and thanksgiving, but turned out to be a day of protest from different "online" groups and organizations in Philippines.

2015

Charlie Hebdo response 
In response to the Charlie Hebdo shooting, the Anonymous released a statement offering condolences to the families affected by it and denounced the attacks as an "inhuman assault" on freedom of expression. They also addressed the terrorists: "[a] message for al-Qaeda, the Islamic State, and other terrorists – we are declaring war against you, the terrorists." As such, Anonymous plans to target Jihadist websites and social media accounts linked to supporting Islamic terrorism with the aim of disrupting them and shutting them down.

Gas station hacks
On February 11, Anonymous hacked at least 1 gas station automated tank gauge, changing the online name from "DIESEL" to "WE_ARE_LEGION". Theregister.co.uk stated that a hacker with this kind of access could shut down the entire station by "spoofing the reported fuel level, generating false alarms, and locking the monitoring service out of the system".

Operation Death Eaters
During the week of February 14, Anonymous launched Operation Death Eaters for collating evidence against international pedophile rings and their severe abuse of children to bring them to justice.

Operation Stop Reclamation
On April 2, 2015. The Pro-Philippine Hackers of Anonymous Philippines attacked and defaced a total of 132 Chinese government, educational and commercial websites in response to China's reclamation work in territorial disputes in the South China Sea, parts of which Manila calls the West Philippine Sea.

Operation Anon Down 
On July 17, 2015, an Anon in a Guy Fawkes mask was shot and killed by a Royal Canadian Mounted Police (RCMP) officer. As a result, Anonymous websites and YouTube channels vowed revenge, initiating Operation Anon Down. The RCMP website was reported down nationwide on July 19.

Operation StormFront 
On July 21, 2015, Anonymous posted a video claiming that due to "Racism, Antisemitism, Islamophobia and Holocaust Denial" they were going to attack the website Stormfront. This website is a white-supremacist website run by former KKK Leader Don Black. The attack was planned for August 1, 2015.

Operation KKK (OPKKK) 
Operation KKK says it has identifying data on as many as 1,000 KKK members and supporters. On Oct. 22, 2015, an Anonymous-associated Twitter account announced that the hacking collective had accessed a Klan-associated Twitter account and promised that they would expose about 1,000 Klan members by name. A later news release promised that the operation would release "names and Web sites, new and old" of "more than 1000″ members of the hate group. According to the Daily Dot, Anonymous later released "a few hundred names, Facebook pages, and Google+ accounts."

2016

Operation Comelec

Anonymous Philippines hacked the Commission on Elections (COMELEC) website to force them to add security to vote count machines (VCMs). The hacking was followed by a voters' personal information leak, led by LulzSec Pilipinas, who placed them in the website "wehaveyourdata.com". Paul Biteng, a 20-year old information technology (IT) graduate and one of the hackers of the COMELEC, website was soon arrested by National Bureau of Investigation (NBI) agents.

Operation Single Gateway 
After the failure of its single gateway system, the Thai government proposed amendments to the existing Computer Crime Act in May 2016, which they approved on December 16. Anonymous declared cyberwar on Thailand after the passing of these amendments. The amendments allowed the government to censor websites and intercept private communications without a court order or warrant. Anonymous started a Facebook group called "citizens against single gateway" to protest against these acts. Other anonymous members DDoSed several Thailand government websites. One of these F5-powered DDoS attacks hit Thailand's defense website on December 19. It was later revealed that hackers also breached the Thai Police Office website on December 17. The website of the Tourism and Sports was also targeted and attacked on December 23. Several Thai citizens who were part of anonymous ranging from ages 17–20 were arrested.

2017

Operation Darknet Relaunch 
Visitors to more than 10,000 Tor-based websites were met with an alarming announcement on February 3, 11:50 AM EST: "Hello, Freedom Hosting II, you have been hacked." A group affiliating itself with Anonymous had compromised servers at Freedom Hosting II, a popular service for hosting websites accessible only through Tor.

Anonymous claimed over 50% of the data stored on the Freedom Hosting II servers contained child pornography. International Business Times reported that the hackers stole 75 GB worth of files and 2.6 GB of databases.

According to Sarah Jamie Lewis, an independent anonymity and privacy researcher who spotted the mass hack as part of her regular scans of the Onion space (Dark Web sites running on the Tor network), Freedom Hosting II was hosting an estimated 20% of all websites on the Dark Web.

2018

Unconfirmed hack of Gabon's official websites 
Anonymous had reportedly attacked at least 70 Gabon's official sites, putting them offline. They said that their actions 'targeted dictatorships', however there was no independent confirmation of the Anonymous claim.

2019

Chilean Army emails leak 
Anonymous accessed six email accounts of the Chilean Army and revealed 2.34 gigabytes of data related to intelligence, operations, finances and international relations generated and received by those emails from 2015 to 2019. The leaked data encompassed a total of 44 emails, 1,340 documents, 401 images, 53 text files, 10 webpages, nine folders and three videos. Anonymous also published a series of press articles, internal newsletters, travel information, judicial notices and resolutions, purchase quotes, seminars and other files of the institution. As a result, in an official statement, the Chilean Army had activated its cybersecurity protocols to prevent similar acts from happening in the future, while pointing out that the affected accounts were provided by an external company which were being used to interact, share and/or send and receive data with suppliers or institutions with a regular relationship with the Chilean Army.

#OpHongKong 
During the 2019 Hong Kong protests and the siege of the Hong Kong Polytechnic University, Anonymous announced its hack on four Chinese MongoDB databases, in which they had donated to a data breach notification service vigilante.pw. In a media statement they warned that "all is possible, nothing is secure", and "if Hong Kong is suppressed then China would eye Taiwan as the next target, which can precede a World War 3", while referencing the Terminator movie quote "There’s no fate but what we make for ourselves".

2020

#PLDTHacked 
On May 28, 2020, the Twitter account of PLDT's customer service was hacked by a Filipino anonymous group as a protest to the terrible internet connection serviced by PLDT. The hackers also changed the profile's name to "PLDT Doesn't Care".

The first tweet by the hackers states: "As the pandemic arises, Filipinos need fast internet to communicate with their loved ones. Do your job. The corrupt fear us, the honest support us, the heroic join us. We are Anonymous. We are Legion. We do not forgive. We do not forget . Expect us."

#BlackLivesMatter Movement 
Anonymous declared a large hacking sequence on May 28, three days after the murder of George Floyd. An individual claiming to be Anonymous stated that "We are Legion. We do not forgive. We do not forget. Expect us." in a now-deleted video. Anonymous addressed police brutality and vowed that they "will be exposing your many crimes to the world". It is suspected that Anonymous are the cause for the downtime and public suspension of the Minneapolis Police Department website and its parent site, the website of the City of Minneapolis. The webpage belonging to a minor United Nations agency was also turned into a memorial for George Floyd.

BlueLeaks

Anonymous claimed responsibility for stealing and leaking a trove of documents collectively nicknamed 'BlueLeaks'. The 269-gigabyte collection was published by a leak-focused activist group known as Distributed Denial of Secrets.

Bolsonaro hack and support of Julian Assange
In June 4, a group of hackers has released personal information on Brazilian president Jair Bolsonaro and his family and cabinet. Justice minister André Mendonça asked the Federal Police to begin an investigation. Then  a parliamentary inquiry by the Brazilian Congress investigating the issue of fake news on the internet issued a report showing that the federal government used R$2 million in public money to fund advertising on several websites, some of them responsible for supporting the president. Furthermore, Anonymous took down Atlanta Police Department's website via DDoS, and defaced websites such as a Filipino governmental webpage and that of Brookhaven National Labs. They expressed support for Julian Assange and press freedom, while briefly "taking a swing" against Facebook, Reddit and Wikipedia for having 'engaged in shady practices behind our prying eyes'. In the case of Reddit, they posted a link to a court document describing the possible involvement of a moderator of a large traffic subreddit (r/news) in an online harassment-related case.

#UgandanLivesMatter 
On November 20, 2020, the Uganda Police website was hacked as it was down for a number of days. Anonymous came out and claimed the hack in a tweet in response to the violent crackdown on protesters following the arrest of presidential candidate, popstar Bobi Wine. "Uganda: Police (@PoliceUg) have murdered at least 28 people, arrested 577, and injured dozens more with live ammunition, beatings, tear gas, and water cannons.  At a protest challenging President Yoweri Museveni's 34-year reign. UgandaIsBleeding ugandanlivesmatter." read the retweet by Anonymous International  account. The first tweet about the hack was done by a claimed member of Anonymous stating that Uganda police force website has been taken offline in response to the violent crackdown on protesters. They should have expected us.. "

2021

#OpsWakeUp21 
Anonymous announced cyber-attacks on at least five Malaysian websites including that of Johor and Sabah state governments as well as the International Trade and Industry Ministry. As a result, 11 individuals were nabbed as suspects.

Operation Jane and Epik hack 

The Texas Heartbeat Act, a law which bans abortions after six weeks of pregnancy, came into effect in Texas on September 1, 2021. The law relies on private citizens to file civil lawsuits against anyone who performs or induces an abortion, or aids and abets one, once "cardiac activity" in an embryo can be detected via transvaginal ultrasound, which is usually possible beginning at around six weeks of pregnancy. Shortly after the law came into effect, anti-abortion organizations set up websites to collect "whistleblower" reports of suspected violators of the bill.

On September 3, Anonymous announced "Operation Jane", a campaign focused on stymying those who attempted to enforce the law by "exhaust[ing] the investigational resources of bounty hunters, their snitch sites, and online gathering spaces until no one is able to maintain data integrity". On September 11, the group hacked the website of the Republican Party of Texas, replacing it with text about Anonymous, an invitation to join Operation Jane, and a Planned Parenthood donation link.

On September 13, Anonymous released a large quantity of private data belonging to Epik, a domain registrar and web hosting company known for providing services to websites that host far-right, neo-Nazi, and other extremist content. Epik had briefly provided services to an abortion "whistleblower" website run by the anti-abortion Texas Right to Life organization, but the reporting form went offline on September 4 after Epik told the group they had violated their terms of service by collecting private information about third parties. The data included domain purchase and transfer details, account credentials and logins, payment history, employee emails, and unidentified private keys. The hackers claimed they had obtained "a decade's worth of data" which included all customers and all domains ever hosted or registered through the company, and which included poorly encrypted passwords and other sensitive data stored in plaintext. Later on September 13, the Distributed Denial of Secrets (DDoSecrets) organization said they were working to curate the allegedly leaked data for public download, and said that it consisted of "180gigabytes of user, registration, forwarding and other information". Publications including The Daily Dot and The Record by Recorded Future subsequently confirmed the veracity of the hack and the types of data that had been exposed.

Concurrently, the group announced that they have hacked the accounts of German conspiracy theorist Attila Hildmann; as a result one of its Twitter accounts @AnonNewsDE has been suspended and in turn caused reactions from politicians such as the MEP of the German Pirate Party, Patrick Breyer who had recommended the microblogging service Mastodon as an alternative. The hacker collective wrote that the blocking does not restrict the group in its work. The suspension caused the hashtag #FreeAnonNewsDe to be trending on Twitter in Germany.

Hack of Brazilian municipal website 
The Brazilian branch of the hacking group hacked the website of the Brumadinho City Hall and left a video to commemorate the dam disaster that occurred on 25 January 2019 which caused the deaths of 270 people.

2022

Operations during the Russian invasion of Ukraine 

Anonymous declared that they had launched 'cyber operations' against the Russian Federation, in retaliation for the invasion of Ukraine ordered by Russian president Vladimir Putin. Websites targeted include the state-controlled RT.

Anonymous is also believed to be responsible for hacking several Russian state TV channels; many users on Twitter and TikTok uploaded videos showing channels playing Ukrainian music and displaying pro-Ukraine images, flags, and symbols. Furthermore, they had hacked Russian television services in order to broadcast footage of the war in Ukraine, and systems believed to be related to Russian space agency Roscosmos where they defaced its website and leaked mission files.

A yacht allegedly belonging to Vladimir Putin was reportedly hacked by the group where they changed its call sign to “FCKPTN” and setting its target destination to “hell”. Furthermore, they broadcast a troll face picture through a hacked Russian military radio.

At least 2,500 Russian and Belarusian targets were reportedly hacked by Anonymous. These included more than three hundred websites of Russian government agencies, state media outlets, banks, as well as websites of leading Belarusian banks such as Belarusbank, Priorbank and Belinvestbank. Furthermore, they also hacked a website belonging to Chechnya's regional government. They also warned that “If things continue as they have been in the past few days, the cyber war will be expanded and our measures will be massively increased. This is the final warning to the entire Russian government. Don’t mess with Anonymous.”

In response to the seizure of Ukraine's Zaporizhia Nuclear Power Plant by Russia, Anonymous defaced the website of Rosatom and gained access to gigabytes of data which they intended to leak publicly. Furthermore, they had hacked into printers in Russia to spread anti-propaganda messages.

Anonymous leaked 446 GB of data from the Russian Ministry of Culture and had hacked Russian companies Aerogas, Forest, and Petrovsky Fort. From there they leaked around 437,500 emails which they donated to non-profit whistleblower organization Distributed Denial of Secrets. Following that, the hacking collective hacked and leaked 87,500 emails from an engineering firm Neocom Geoservice, which specialises in exploring oil and gas fields and providing drilling support.

In a similar fashion mentioned above, Russian investment company Accent Capital had its computer systems hacked and its 365,000 letters leaked online.

The hacking collective leaked 82GB of emails from Australian police in protest of that country's offshore detention of refugees.

On May 9, 2022, which is the Victory Day in Russia, the video-hosting website RuTube was taken down through cyberattacks, which Anonymous had claimed responsibility later. Furthermore, Network Battalion 65 (NB65), a hacktivist group affiliated with Anonymous, has reportedly hacked Russian payment processor Qiwi. A total of 10.5 terabytes of data including transaction records and customers' credit cards had been exfiltrated. They further infected Qiwi with ransomwares and threatened to release more customer records.

Anonymous proceeded to hack Russian firms SOCAR Energoresource and Metprom Group LLC and dump their emails, the latter which was hacked by the Anonymous actors DepaixPorteur, B00daMooda, and Wh1t3Sh4d0w. Furthermore, Anonymous hacked into Vyberi Radio and published more than 1,000,000 emails.

DDoSecrets published 1 terabyte of data obtained from Anonymous, which included millions of files including emails, court files, client data, classified data, photographs, videos, payment information, and more from Rustam Kurmaev and Partners (RKPLaw), which was hacked by Anonymous actors DepaixPorteur and B00daMooda.

Anonymous member "YourAnonSpider" had reportedly hacked into a Russian military UAV (Unmanned Aerial Vehicles) company in which plans and tactics regarding the use of drones in warfare had been stolen.

The collective claimed responsibility for hacking Yandex Taxi on early September 2022 which sent dozens of cars to a location resulting in a traffic jam that lasted up to three hours.

See also
 Anonymous (group)
 2016 Dyn cyberattack

References

Further reading
 How Anonymous Picks Targets, Launches Attacks, and Takes Powerful Organizations Down by Quinn Norton July 3, 2012 Wired.com, includes timeline of events.
 The Secret Lives of Dangerous Hackers; 'We Are Anonymous' by Parmy Olson May 31, 2012
 Parmy Olson We Are Anonymous timeline on pages 421-431 Hachette Book Group USA 

Anonymous (hacker group)
Articles containing video clips
Anonymous
Denial-of-service attacks
Imageboards
Internet culture
Internet events
Internet memes
Social media campaigns
Computing timelines